Radeh-ye Madan (also known as Madan) is a village in Bahmanshir-e Shomali Rural District, in the Central District of Abadan County, Khuzestan Province, Iran. At the 2006 census, its population was 694, in 132 families.

References 

Populated places in Abadan County